The 1958–59 season was the 60th season of competitive league football in the history of English football club Wolverhampton Wanderers. They played in the First Division, then the highest level of English football, for a 22nd consecutive year.

The season was a major success as the club won the League championship for a third and final time, successfully defending their title they already held. For a second consecutive season they scored over 100 league goals. They also participated in European competition for the first time in their history.

Wolves achieved the double over local rivals Aston Villa, part of a run of seven between 1957 and 1960.

Results

Football League

A total of 22 teams competed in the First Division in the 1958–59 season. Each team would play every other team twice, once at their stadium, and once at the opposition's. Two points were awarded to teams for each win, one point per draw, and none for defeats.

Final table

Results by round

FA Cup

As a First Division team, Wolves entered the competition at the third round stage. The draw for this round was made on 8 December 1958.

FA Charity Shield

European Cup

In Wolves' first-ever competitive European tie they were drawn against West German champions Schalke 04 in the second round of the European Cup, having received a bye in the first round. Their appearance in the competition made them only the third English side at that time to ever play in a European competition.

Players

Top scorer

Most appearances

Transfers

In
None

Out

References

1958–59
Wolverhampton Wanderers F.C.
1959